Karacalar is a village in the Emirdağ District, Afyonkarahisar Province, Turkey. Its population is 667 (2021).

The village was founded in the 1730s as Kiliççeken, it was later renamed Üç Kuyu, then in 1850 Karacalar.

Population

Migration
Many inhabitants from Karacalar migrated to Western Europe since the 1960s.

The reportedly first migrant from the Emirdag district to Belgium, in 1963, was 'Kötü Ahmet', Ahmet Öztürk, originally from Karacalar. In 2000 his son Mustafa Öztürk was elected as a municipal councillor in the Belgian commune of Schaerbeek.

The village head Nurettin Shahbaz, who was in charge for four mandates between 1984 and 2014, lived and worked himself in Belgium in 1973-1974 as a toiler in a cement factory in Ottignies. He came back after having lost two children in the fire of his housing in Brussels. Most of his brothers and sisters, and one of his sons, stayed in Belgium. The Shahbaz family is well known in the Turkish neighbourhood in Brussels (Schaerbeek and Saint-Josse-ten-Noode) as the Dede of the Karacalar Alevis has traditionally been one of his members.

Village heads
List of the village heads ( Köy muhtar)
Çolakoglu
Seyıt Izcı 
Süleyman Bağseven 1938 
Bekir Şahbaz 1943 
Mehmet Kubat 1947 
Tahir Baş 1950 
Süleyman Sarıgöz 1959 
Mahmut Gökkaya 1964
Muhittin Atmaca 1968 
Ahmet Baş 1973 
Latif Kahya 1977  
A. Nurettin Şahbaz 1984 
Tahir Atmaca 1989  
A. Nurettin Şahbaz 1994 
Dogan Polat 1999 
A. Nurettin Şahbaz 2004 
A. Nurettin Şahbaz 2009 
Mustafa Çandır 2014

Personalities from Karacalar
 Sait Köse, businessman, alderman in Schaerbeek (Belgium) since 2001
 Ahmet Öztürk "Kötü Ahmet"
 Ramazan Kubat, Turkish folk singer

References

Villages in Emirdağ District